Neumarkt in der Oberpfalz (Bavarian: Naimakk in da Owerpfolz) is the capital of the Neumarkt district in the administrative region of the Upper Palatinate, in Bavaria, Germany.  With a population of about 40,000, Neumarkt is the seat of various projects, and acts as the economic and cultural center of the western Upper Palatinate, along with Nürnberg, Ingolstadt, and Regensburg.

Geography
Neumarkt lies on the western edge of the Franconian Jura, nestled in a valley.  The municipal region reaches as far as the Bavarian Jura to the east.  The Neumarkt valley drains to the north through the Schwarzach River, a tributary of the Regnitz, eventually flowing into the Main, and to the south through the Sulz, a tributary of the Altmühl, which eventually flows into the Danube.  The Ludwig Canal cuts through the area from North to South, bridging the European water divide.  The elevation varies from 406 meters on the Beckenmühle River to the north, to 595 meters in the vicinity of Fuchsberg; as a reference, the elevation of city hall is given as 423 meters.

The municipal region has an area of 73.09 km2.  The following municipalities, all of which belong to the Neumarkt district, border the district capital.  They are named clockwise, beginning in the north: Berg, Pilsach, Velburg, Deining, Sengenthal, Berngau and Postbauer-Heng.

Geology
Neumarkt is located on the western edge of a former Coral Reef (now called the Franconian Jura) of the Tethys Ocean during the Jurassic.  The floor of the valley is predominately sandy, whence came the earlier name Neumarkt auf dem Sand (Neumarkt on the Sand), on the sides are isolated regions of loam.  The mountains are formed of hard Limestone containing numerous springs, including, for example, the source of the White Laber River near Voggenthal.

Municipal subdivision
The core of the municipal area is the Old City and its still-recognized borders.  The first housing developments built outside the city walls began in 1850 to the east, along Mühlstraße, Mariahilfstraße, and Badstraße.  To the south, the Industrial area developed beginning around 1920.  After 1945, the city expanded to the north and west, and eventually grew together with the municipalities of Woffenbach and Holzheim.  Numerous other settlements developed around the city center, named, going clockwise from the north: Altenhof, Koppenmühle, Kohlenbrunnermühle, Mühlen, Wolfstein (at the site of the former Prison Work Camp), Weinberg, Schlosserhügel, and Hasenheide.

During the 1972 Municipality Reforms, nine municipalities were merged with the city, substantially increasing the municipal area.

History
Traces of the earliest settlement at Neumarkt go back as far as the Neolithic period.  Around Neumarkt there are numerous burial mounds and multiple Celtic embankments.  The town is assumed to have been first founded by the Bavarii in the 6th or 7th century, for example, the quarter of the city now named Pölling.

The precise date of the city's founding is unknown, but its founding as "neuer Markt" is assumed to have happened in the beginning of the 12th century, on the trade route between Nuremberg and Regensburg.  The city was first mentioned in a document in 1135, and city fortifications were mentioned for the first time in 1315.  In the 13th century Emperor Frederick II granted Neumarkt Reichsfreiheit, and with it, the right to collect customs on trade between Nuremberg and Regensburg and itself.  However, the city never enforced this status, because the city fell to the Wittelsbachs in 1329 through the Treaty of Pavia.

In the 15th and 16th centuries, Neumarkt was the residence of the rulers of the Palatinate.  Count Johann von Pfalz-Neumarkt established the seat of his government here, and began to develop the city into a residency.  Included in his work are the church of St. Johannes, the Court Chapel, and the castle of the counts of the Palatinate.  Johann was succeeded by Counts Otto I, his son Otto II, and Frederick II, who later became an Elector, and moved to Heidelberg.

After the Palatinate Counts left, Neumarkt lost much of its importance.  Subsequently, the city played a part in political and economic life only for the surrounding area, and the growth of the city stopped almost entirely.  The next perceptible period of growth did not occur until the middle of the 19th century.  In the Thirty Years' War, Neumarkt was occupied by Swedish troops from 1633 to 1635 and from 1646 to 1649.  Both times the city was plundered and partially destroyed.

During the war of the First Coalition a dramatic encounter between the French and Austria troops occurred in Neumarkt in the Summer of 1796.  The French barricaded themselves in the city and the Austrians began its complete destruction.  Only through the intervention of a smith from Neumarkt, who single-handedly opened the upper gate, was something worse averted.  Neumarkt attained the status of Bavarian imperial city, and was the seat of a district court after the Kingdom of Bavaria was formed by Napoleon in 1806.

In the 19th century Neumarkt gradually developed into an industrial center.  Beginning in 1830, thousands of laborers worked on the Ludwigskanal in the vicinity of Neumarkt, the completion of which, in 1846, made Neumarkt a port city.  The Express-Werken, established in Neumarkt in 1884, were continental Europe's first bicycle factory.

The economic and political results of World War I were quickly noticeable in Neumarkt.  Over 300 of its young men fell on the battlefield.

In September 1923 one of the first local chapters of the Nazi Party was founded in Neumarkt, which appeared publicly on September 23 for "German Day". The chapter was created shortly before the death of Dietrich Eckart, one of the founders of the Nazi party, who was born in Neumarkt. The removal of active party members, however, led to its quick disintegration.  The party was not reorganized in Neumarkt until 1928. In 1934, in memory of Eckart, the town was officially given the added suffix "Dietrich-Eckart-city". In that year, Adolf Hitler inaugurated a monument in Eckart's honour in the city park. It has since been rededicated to Christopher of Bavaria (1416-1448), King of Denmark, who was probably born in the town.

Economy
The Lammsbräu Brewery is located in the town.

Sports
Neumarkt offers sport activities like martial arts (Judo, Karate, Taekwondo, Aikido, Boxing and Thai boxing) as well as table tennis, wheelchair sports, athletics, bowling, volleyball, wrestling and tennis. league and wrestling.

Twin towns – sister cities

Neumarkt in der Oberpfalz is twinned with:
 Issoire, France
 Mistelbach, Austria

Notable people

Christopher of Bavaria (1416–1448), King of Denmark, Norway and Sweden
Otto II, Count Palatine of Mosbach-Neumarkt (1425–1499), Pfalzgraf, bridesman at the Landshut Wedding, astronomer and mathematician
Caspar Schoppe (1576–1649), publicist of the Counter-Reformation
Martin Schrettinger (1772–1851), library scientist
Dietrich Eckart (1868–1923), poet, playwright, journalist and political activist
Max Feldbauer (1869–1948), painter
August Rinaldi (1883–1962), film architect
Michael Rackl (1883–1948), Bishop of Eichstätt
Käthe Dorsch (1890–1957), actress
Ludwig Ott (1906–1985), Catholic theology professor, dogmatist and mediavist
Adolf Beck (1938–2009), politician (CSU), member of Landtag of Bavaria 1970–2003
Alois Karl (born 1950), Lord Mayor of Neumarkt 1990–2005, since 2005 Bundestag deputy
Karl-Heinz Radschinsky (born 1953), weight lifter
Stefan Körner (born 1968), politician (Pirate Party Germany)

See also
Museum for Historical Maybach Vehicles

References

Neumarkt (district)